"Min izāmō" ("My Fatherland") is the ethnic anthem of the Livonians. The song was written by Kōrli Stalte (1870–1947), a poet and spiritual leader of Livonians, to a melody composed by Fredrik Pacius (the same melody used for the anthems of Finland and Estonia). It is written in the Livonian language. The anthem was first sung by the Livonian Union’s four-part choir at the Livonian flag-raising celebration at the fall of 1923.

Lyrics

See also 
 "Maamme"
 "Mu isamaa, mu õnn ja rõõm"

References

External links 
 Livonian symbols
 Printed music with the original Swedish lyrics « Vårt land »

European anthems
Anthem
Regional songs
Anthems of organizations